Burjuc is a commune in Hunedoara County, Romania. It is composed of six villages: Brădățel (Bradacel), Burjuc, Glodghilești (Glodgilesd), Petrești (Petresd), Tătărăști (Tataresd) and Tisa (Tisza).

References

Communes in Hunedoara County